This is a list of equipment used by the National Army of Colombia.

Land vehicles

Multipurpose vehicles

Artillery

Infantry weapons

Self-propelled artillery

Systems of anti-aircraft defense

Weapons

Aircraft

References

Colombia
Military equipment of Colombia